George Godfrey (born June 18, 1944, in Lodi, Wisconsin, United States) is an American curler.

Awards
United States Curling Hall of Fame: 2001

Teams

Personal life
George Godfrey started curling in 1952, when he was 8 years old.

He graduated from University of Wisconsin-Platteville.

References

External links
 
 Video: 

Living people
1944 births
People from Lodi, Wisconsin
Sportspeople from Madison, Wisconsin
American male curlers
American curling champions
University of Wisconsin–Platteville alumni